Paul Mason (23 June 1952 – 9 May 2006) was a British sculptor and artist working mainly in stone and marble. Winner of the Royal Academy Gold Medal in 1976, his work has been exhibited in the United Kingdom and Europe, including the Tate Gallery, St Ives and the Bauhaus Kunst-Archiv in Berlin.

Personal life and education

Paul William Mason was born on 23 June 1952 in Bolton, Lancashire. Mason first married Susan Disley, a ceramicist, with whom he had a son, Joseph. He later married a painter, Emma Talbot, to whom he was married at the time of his death. Together they had sons Zachary and Daniel. As of 2006, Emma was the Head of Painting and Two-Dimensional (2D) at St Martin's College, University of the Arts, London.

Mason studied first at Bolton College of Art & Design from 1970 to 71. Next he studied at Wolverhampton Polytechnic from 1971 to 74, under John Paddison, and finally at the Royal Academy from 1974 to 77, under Willi Soukop.

Career

He is known for his exterior sculptures, dubbed "iconic stone carved pieces that are large scale interpretations of natural form", but he also painted, drew, created collages and made smaller sculptures.

Of his works, Mason said:
My works attempt to recognise and emulate the natural forces inherent in both carving and the geology. There is something deeply attractive and satisfying about the sculptural processes on both scales, and the dialogue between them that occurs quite naturally within the fragment and the whole.

He taught from 1993–1997 at Northumbria University. Mason taught at Derby University after Northumbria. In 2004, at Derby University, he became Professor of Sculpture. Mason also taught at art schools in Loughborough and Staffordshire.

Mason had in-house residencies in his career, including one at Gloucester Cathedral in 2000–01 and the other in 1996 at Tate St. Ives, where he worked in Barbara Hepworth’s Studio.

Works
This is a partial list of Mason's works.

Exhibitions
The following are partial lists of Mason's exhibitions.

Solo exhibitions
2005	Stone Landscapes. Quay Arts. Newport Isle of Wight.
2001	"Division as Structure" Reliefs & Drawings Bauhaus Archiv, Berlin.
1998 Six Chapel Row, Bath.
1997	"From the Ocean Floor" Djanogly Arts Centre, Nottingham.
1996	Tate Gallery St Ives. Installation and new work sited throughout the permanent collection.

Group exhibitions
2004	Fermynwoods Gallery, Northampton with John Holden
1999 Dock Museum, Barrow in Furness.
1997	Drawing Exhibition, Newlyn Art Gallery.
1995	"Divers Memories" Pitt Rivers Museum, Oxford.

Retrospective exhibitions
2012 Tarpey Gallerys

References

Further reading
Mason, Paul. (1987). Paul Mason: "the Cutting Edge": Sculpture 1977–1987. Contributors: Bolton Museum and Art Gallery, Usher Gallery in Lincoln, and Wolverhampton Art Gallery. Bolton Museum and Art Gallery. .

External links
 The Poetics of Making, about Paul Mason
 Transformations of matter: contemporary carving in stone – Info about some of Mason's works
 Works & images
 Residency at Gloucester Cathedral
 The Gibberd Garden

1952 births
2006 deaths
20th-century British sculptors
British male sculptors
20th-century British male artists